Voltaic Solidarity (in French: Solidarité Voltaïque) was a political alliance in Upper Volta formed after the territorial elections in . SV was constituted by the Social Party for the Emancipation of the African Masses (PSEMA), African Popular Movement (MPA) and the Voltaic Democratic Movement (MDV). SV demanded the resignation of the vice-president of the territory, Ouezzin Coulibaly. A motion of no-confidence was called for, but four SV deputes sided with the government and the motion was defeated. One of those four deputies was Maurice Yaméogo, who joined the African Democratic Rally.

In 1958 SV joined the African Regroupment Party.

Source: Englebert, Pierre. La Revolution Burkinabè. Paris: L'Harmattan, 1986.

Defunct political party alliances in Burkina Faso